Dark Sea is a 2013 Brazilian horror film directed by Rodrigo Aragão. The film was premiered at Festival de Vitória on October 28, 2013.

Plot
A black spot comes to the shores of a small village in Brazil, bringing a strange disease that turns the sea animals in predatory killers. To survive and save his beloved, Albino risks his life and his soul to fight the monsters.

References

External links
 

Brazilian horror films
2013 horror films
Brazilian independent films
2013 films